Lar , is a town in tehsil and district Multan of Punjab, Pakistan. It lies on the N-5 National Highway.

Health
 LRBT Free Secondary Eye Hospital

References

Populated places in Multan District